Velo-Vocha is a municipality in the Corinthia regional unit, Peloponnese, Greece. The seat of the municipality is the town Zevgolateio. The municipality has an area of 164.847 km2.

Municipality
The municipality Velo-Vocha was formed at the 2011 local government reform by the merger of the following 2 former municipalities, that became municipal units:
Velo
Vocha

References

Municipalities of Peloponnese (region)
Populated places in Corinthia